Asia is an unincorporated community in Franklin County, Tennessee, United States.

Asia School, which is listed on the National Register of Historic Places, is located in Asia.

Notes

Unincorporated communities in Franklin County, Tennessee
Unincorporated communities in Tennessee